Obania is a genus of butterflies in the family Lycaenidae. Obania is endemic to the Afrotropical realm.

Species
Obania subvariegata (Grose-Smith & Kirby, 1890)
Obania tullia (Staudinger, 1892)
Obania tulliana (Grose-Smith, 1901)

References

Poritiinae
Butterfly genera